Carlos Ariel Luna (born January 17, 1982 in Piquillín, Córdoba) is a retired Argentine footballer who played as a forward.

Career
Luna started his career in 2000 in the 3rd tier of Argentine football with Deportivo Español. In 2001-2002 he was part of the squad that won promotion to the Primera B Nacional where he played for one season before dropping back down a division to play for All Boys in 2003-2004 and Club Atlético Tigre in 2004-2005.

Luna was signed by Racing Club de Avellaneda of the Primera Division Argentina for the 2005-2006 season but was offloaded to Quilmes in 2006.

During his time at Quilmes the club endured one of their worst seasons finishing bottom of the table with only 21 points. Despite the weakness of the team Luna managed to score seven goals in the Clausura 2007 tournament, bringing him to the attention of Elche and prompting his move to Spain during the June–July 2007 transfer window.
During the Clausura 2009 Luna scored 11 goals, nearly half of Tigre's 24 and helped them to qualify for the Copa Sudamericana 2009. LDU Quito signed the Argentine forward "El Chino" for $3m from Argentine side Club Atlético Tigre.

On March 17, 2011 in a match versus Peñarol, Luna scored the 12,000th goal in the history of the Copa Libertadores.

Honors

Club
Deportivo Español
Primera B Metropolitana: 2001–02

LDU Quito
Serie A: 2010
Recopa Sudamericana: 2010

Individual
Argentine Primera División top scorer (1): Clausura 2012

Notes

External links

1982 births
Living people
Argentine footballers
Argentine expatriate footballers
Association football forwards
Deportivo Español footballers
Club Atlético Tigre footballers
Racing Club de Avellaneda footballers
Quilmes Atlético Club footballers
All Boys footballers
Club Atlético River Plate footballers
Rosario Central footballers
L.D.U. Quito footballers
Elche CF players
Argentine Primera División players
Segunda División players
Ecuadorian Serie A players
Expatriate footballers in Ecuador
Expatriate footballers in Spain
Argentine expatriate sportspeople in Ecuador
Argentine expatriate sportspeople in Spain
Sportspeople from Córdoba Province, Argentina